"After the Disco" is a song by American alternative rock band Broken Bells. Written by band members James Mercer and Brian Burton and produced by the latter, it was originally recorded by the band for their second studio album, After the Disco, where it appears as the second track. It was released as the second single from After the Disco in the United Kingdom on January 7, 2014. This song is included in Pro Evolution Soccer 2016 as part of its soundtrack.

Track listing

Personnel
Adapted from After the Disco liner notes.

Charts

Release history

References

2014 songs
2014 singles
Broken Bells songs
Columbia Records singles
Songs written by Danger Mouse (musician)
Songs written by James Mercer (musician)
Song recordings produced by Danger Mouse (musician)